Elections for the fifth Knesset were held in Israel on 15 August 1961. Voter turnout was 81.6%.

Parliament factions

The table below lists the parliamentary factions represented in the 4th Knesset.

Results

Aftermath

During the Knesset term, eight MKs broke away from Mapai to establish Rafi and two MKs left Maki to establish Rakah. Herut and the Liberal Party merged to form Gahal. Seven Liberal Party members unhappy with the decision (largely former Progressive Party members) broke away to form the Independent Liberals.

Tenth government

The fifth Knesset started with David Ben-Gurion's Mapai party forming the tenth government on 2 November 1961. His coalition included the National Religious Party, Ahdut HaAvoda, Agudat Israel Workers, Cooperation and Brotherhood and Progress and Development, and had 13 ministers. Kadish Luz of Mapai was appointed Knesset Speaker. The government collapsed when Ben-Gurion resigned on 16 June 1963 citing personal reasons, but in reality was annoyed at a perceived lack of support from his colleagues. He later broke away from Mapai with several colleagues to form Rafi.

Eleventh government

Levi Eshkol took over Mapai and formed the eleventh government on 26 June 1963 with the same coalition partners as previously, but one more minister. The government resigned on 10 December 1964 when Ben-Gurion demanded that members of the Supreme Court investigate the Lavon Affair.

Twelfth government

Eshkol formed the twelfth government a week later on 22 December 1964 with the same coalition partners and ministers as previously.

The fifth Knesset was notable for the coalescing of the two major right-wing parties (Herut and the Liberal Party) to form an electoral block (Gahal) capable of threatening Mapai's hegemony in Israeli politics. Gahal, which by then had become Likud, finally overtook Mapai (which had merged into the Alignment) in the 1977 elections.

Notes

References

External links
Historical overview of the Fifth Knesset Knesset website 
Election results Knesset website
The Fifth Knesset Knesset website

Legislative
Legislative election
Legislative elections in Israel
Israel
Israel